Dad's Garage Theatre Company, located at 569 Ezzard St. in the Old Fourth Ward in Atlanta, Georgia, was founded in 1995 by Chris Blair, Marc Cram, Sean Daniels, George Faughnan, John Gregorio, David Keeton, Joseph Limbaugh, Matt Stanton, and Matt Young. A second wave of people in the founding summer soon followed, and the theatre company spent the next five years establishing itself in the Atlanta improv and theatre communities. The small theater company has since achieved international recognition for original stage productions and Improvisational comedy. The Second City executive producer Jon Carr is a former artistic director. Lara Smith, managing director, announced that she will be stepping down in late 2021.

History
On June 23, 1995, Dad's Garage opened its doors at 280 Elizabeth St., a building which formerly housed celebrated theater company Actor's Express, with the comedy play Fun With Science. The company then produced the regional premiere of Eric Bogosian's subUrbia in 1996, followed by an adaptation of Cannibal! The Musical by Trey Parker and Matt Stone in the fall of 1998, a production considered a breakthrough moment for the theatre company in the Atlanta arts scene. Graham Chapman's O Happy Day had its world premiere at Dad's Garage in 2000, followed by Chapman's Out of The Trees in 2001. In 2002, Dad's Garage produced a play by Chicago's Neo-Futurists, 43 Plays for 43 Presidents, which was attended by former president and First Lady Jimmy and Rosalyn Carter.

In the early and mid-2000's, Dad's Garage produced original new works, including premieres of several plays by Steve Yockey, during his time as Marketing Director.  In the late 2000s, the company started shifting to creating original scripted works and improv, while adopting a democratic system of preparing projects for season planning, though external scripts were still occasionally produced. In the fall of 2010, Dad's Garage secured permission to produce Two Gentlemen of Lebowski, an Elizabethan adaptation of the Coen brothers' film.

A video producing wing, Dad's Garage TV (DGTV), was established in 2011 and continues to produce shorts and web series. In 2013, the property where Dad's Garage rented their theatre went up for sale, and the company began a two-year period of producing without their own facility.  With all its property in storage, the company rented performance space at 7 Stages Theatre, Fabrefaction Theatre (now Brady Street Theatre), and The Alliance Theatre’s Hertz Stage.  Dad's Garage led a very successful fundraising campaign to purchase and renovate an old church that went up for sale when its congregation outgrew the space.  The new Dad's Garage Theatre on Ezzard St. opened its doors on December 31, 2015.  Over the following five years, Dad's Garage continued to produce scripted and improvised plays year-round, as well as expanded its educational offerings with Improv Classes for adults and the creation of a Youth Program for Improv.

In January 2020, Dad's Garage artistic leadership changed hands when Artistic Director Kevin Gillese transitioned to Executive Producer for DGTV, and Ensemble Member and Playwright Jon Carr was hired as the new Artistic Director following a national search.  Most recently, Dad's Garage responded to shutdowns due to the COVID-19 global pandemic by pivoting to live streaming content online.

People

Founders 
 Chris Blair
 Marc Cram
 Sean Daniels
 John Gregorio
 George Faughnan
 David Keeton
 Joseph Limbaugh
 Matt Stanton
 Matt Young

Directors

Artistic Directors 
 Matt Young 1995-1996
 Matt Stanton 1996-1997
 Sean Daniels 1997-2004
 Scott Warren, Interim 2004-2005
 Kate Warner 2005-2009
 Scott Warren, Interim 2009
 Kevin Gillese 2009–2019
 Jon Carr 2019–2021
 Tim Stoltenberg 2021–present

Improv Directors 
 Matt Young 1995-1996
 Joseph Limbaugh 1996-1999
 Chris Blair
 Tim Stoltenberg
 Dan Triandiflou

Associate Artistic Directors 
 Dan Triandiflou and Amber Nash
Amber Nash and Rene Dellefont
 Rene Dellefont and Matt Horgan
 Matt Horgan and Ed Morgan (present)

Special Guests 
Dad's Garage has been host to many celebrity guest improvisers including: Colin Mochrie, Mark Meer, Kevin McDonald, Aisha Tyler, Tim Meadows, Henry Zebrowski, Dave Foley, Phil LaMarr, Thomas Middleditch, Ben Schwartz, Fred Willard, Matt Jones, Scott Adsit, Manon Mathews, David Harbour, Nick Kroll, and Cedric Yarbrough

Improvisational Comedy
Dad's Garage is a Theatresports franchise, its original ensemble having trained with Keith Johnstone, author of Impro: Improvisation and the Theatre and Impro for Storytellers.

Other formats developed at Dad's Garage include the longform shows Murder She Improvised, Scandal!, B.R.A.W.L., Improv D&D, Cage Match, Dice Of Destiny, Improv Idol, Madmen & Poets, Dark Side Of The Room, and Wowee Zowee (an improvised children's show).

Programming

DGTV

Productions 

 Rusty Trombone
 High Fructose Corn Sizzurp
 Up on the Rooftop
 Movers
 Hart of America
 Cinco de Mayo
 That Was Awesome
 The Garage

Twitch 
In March 2020, Dad's Garage temporarily closed to the public for safety concerns due to the COVID-19 global pandemic and pivoted their programming to streaming online via Twitch.

Awards

Dad's Garage has won numerous awards over the years, including multiple wins as Creative Loafing's Best Theater and Best Improv Group in Atlanta.

References

External links
Dad's Garage Theatre Company
Dad's Social Distancing - Twitch Schedule

Theatre companies in Georgia (U.S. state)
Improvisational theatre
Improvisational troupes
Theatres in Atlanta